Liyuan station can refer to:
Liyuan station (Beijing Subway), a metro station in Beijing, China
Liyuan station (Wuhan Metro), a metro station in Wuhan, China
Liyuan station (Shenzhen Line 3), a metro station under construction on Line 3 (Shenzhen Metro) in Longgang District, Shenzhen, China
Liyuan station (Shenzhen Line 17), a metro station under planning on Line 17 (Shenzhen Metro) in Luohu District, Shenzhen, China